The Galle Trilingual Inscription is a stone tablet with an inscription in three languages, Chinese, Tamil and Persian, located in Galle, Sri Lanka. Dated 15 February 1409, it was installed by the Chinese admiral Zheng He in Galle during his grand voyages.

The text concerns offerings made by him and others to the mountain Sri Pada (Adam's Peak) in Sri Lanka. The Chinese inscription mentions offerings to Buddha, the Persian in Perso-Arabic script to Allah and the Tamil inscription mentions offering to Tenavarai Nayanar (Hindu god Vishnu). The admiral invoked the blessings of Hindu deities here for a peaceful world built on trade. The stele was discovered in Galle in 1911 and is now preserved in the Colombo National Museum.

On his third voyage, Zheng He sailed from China in 1409, and carried with him the trilingual tablet which he planned to erect in Sri Lanka. The date equates to 15 February 1409, indicating that it was inscribed in Nanjing before the fleet set out. The Chinese portion gives praise to the Buddha and records lavish offerings in his honour.

The tablet was found by an engineer, S. H. Thomlin, in 1911 in Galle. It can now be seen in the national museum in Sri Lanka. A modern replica of the stele has been installed in the Treasure Boat Shipyard Park in Nanjing, along with copies of other steles associated with the voyages of Zheng He .

Offerings
1,000 pieces of gold; 5,000 pieces of silver; 50 rolls of embroidered silk in many colours; 50 rolls of silk taffeta, in many colours; 4 pairs of jewelled banners, gold embroidered and of variegated silk, 2 pairs of the same picked in red, one pair of the same in yellow, one pair in black; 5 antique brass incense burners; 5 pairs of antique brass flower vases picked in gold on lacquer, with gold stands; 5 yellow brass lamps picked in gold on lacquer with gold stands; 5 incense vessels in vermilion red, gold picked on lacquer, with gold stands; 6 pairs of golden lotus flowers; 2,500 catties of scented oil; 10 pairs of wax candles; 10 sticks of fragrant incense.

Date
The date of 15 February 1409 on the Galle Trilingual Inscription possibly refers to when the trilingual inscription was erected in Galle, indicating that it was put up during the homeward journey of the second voyage. If not, the inscription could have been prepared in China and erected between 1410 when the fleet arrived at Galle to 1411 during the third voyage. J. J. L. Duyvendak (1939) states that the inscription must have been prepared in China on 15 February 1409 and erected during the third expedition (1409–1411), because he thinks that the 15 February 1409 date is connected to the dates for the conference of honors to two deities, Tianfei (天妃) on 21 January 1409 and Nanhaishen (南海神) on 15 February 1409.

Gallery

References

Further reading
 Xinhua News Agency (2005), Zheng He: A Peaceful Mariner and Diplomat.

External links 

 The trilingual inscription of Admiral Zheng He
 The trilingual inscription of Admiral Zheng He [Cheng Ho] 

Multilingual texts
Chinese inscriptions
Persian inscriptions
Tamil inscriptions in Sri Lanka
History of Galle
1411 in Asia
15th-century inscriptions
1410s works
Treasure voyages